Max Marcin (5 May 1879 – 30 March 1948) was a Polish-born American playwright, novelist, screenwriter, and film director. He wrote for 47 films between 1916 and 1949. He also directed six films between 1931 and 1936.  His stage work includes See My Lawyer (1915), directed by Frank M. Stammers; he wrote and/or produced almost 20 plays for Broadway from 1916-38. Marcin wrote for and produced The FBI in Peace and War and created, produced and wrote for the Crime Doctor radio program, which became the basis for a series of ten Crime Doctor films.

He was born in Krotoschen, Posen, Germany (now Poznań, Poland). At the age of seven, Max emigrated to the United States with his father and mother, Hirsch and Johanna Schlamjack, and two siblings, Julius and Emma. They were steerage passengers on the S/S Taormina, which sailed from the Port of Hamburg on 14 July 1886 and arrived at the Port of New York on 2 August 1886. They settled in New York City, where his father continued working as a butcher. Max Schlamjack was admitted to City College as a student in 1895. He began his career as a newspaper reporter in 1898 and, with the passing years, devoted himself to more creative literary work, primarily as a writer of plays and short stories. He died in Tucson, Arizona, aged 68. He was survived by a brother and a sister.

Selected plays
 Are You My Wife? with Roy Atwell
 The House of Glass drama (1913)
 Money Mania farce (1913)
 See My Lawyer (1915)
 Cheating Cheaters (play) (1916) (adapted to film three times)
 Eyes of Youth (1917)
 Here Comes the Bride with Roy Atwell (1917)
 The Woman in Room 13 (1919) Stars Pauline Frederick
 Three Live Ghosts (1920) (producer) based on the novel Three Live Ghosts by Frederic S. Isham
 The Night Cap (1922)
 Mary, Get Your Hair Cut (1922)
 Give and Take (1923) (producer only; written by Aaron Hoffman)
 Silence (1924)
 Badges (1924)
 Kidnapper (1927) co-writer: Samuel Shipman

Selected short stories
 "The Return of Esther" (New York Tribune, Sunday, 11 April 1909)
 "Call of the Schutzenfest" (The Buffalo Courier, Sunday, 5 May 1909)
 "Better Than Rube" (New York Tribune, November 1911)
 "The Spy" (New York Tribune, 1 September 1912)

Novels
 Are You My Wife? (1910) (311 pp., illus.; New York: Moffat, Yard & Co.)
 The Substitute Prisoner (1911) (New York: Moffat, Yard & Co.)

Selected filmography
 Here Comes the Bride (1919)
 Eyes of Youth (1919)
 Three Live Ghosts (1922)
 The Love of Sunya (1927), based on Marcin's play The Eyes of Youth
 Rough House Rosie (1927)
 Three Live Ghosts (1929)
 City Streets (1931)
 Gambling Ship (1933)
 The Jungle Princess (1936)
 Crime Doctor (1943)
 Just Before Dawn (1946)

References

External links
 
 
 
 

1879 births
1948 deaths
Polish film directors
20th-century Polish screenwriters
Male screenwriters
20th-century Polish male writers
Emigrants from the German Empire to the United States